Elections for the Territorial Assembly of Wallis and Futuna were held on 20 March 2022 where all 20 seats were up for election.

Background
The 2017 Wallis and Futuna Territorial Assembly election saw 19 electoral lists sharing the 20 seats of the Territorial Assembly. The only list able to gain two seats was Fakatahi kihe kaha'u e lelei / Ensemble pour un avenir meilleur (Together for a Better Future). There were nine newly elected members in the 20-seat Assembly. Among the elected members, six were women.

The 2017 elections were noted for their very high participation, one of the highest in the recent history of Wallis and Futuna. Slightly more than 88% of the electorate voted, with voter turnout at 87% on Wallis and 93%  on Futuna.

Results
Half the seats were won by new members. Turnout was over 84 percent.

Elected members

References

Elections in Wallis and Futuna
Assembly election
Wallis
Wallis
Wallis